The San Diego Padres are a Major League Baseball (MLB) team based in San Diego, California. The Padres currently compete in the National League (NL) West division. The Padres first played their home games at San Diego Stadium, now called Qualcomm Stadium, and formerly called Jack Murphy Stadium, until , when they moved into Petco Park. The first game of the new baseball season for a team is played on Opening Day, and being named the Opening Day starter is an honor, which is often given to the player who is expected to lead the pitching staff that season, though there are various strategic reasons why a team's best pitcher might not start on Opening Day. The Padres have used 24 different Opening Day starting pitchers in their 42 seasons. The 24 starters have a combined Opening Day record of 15 wins, 14 losses and 13 no decisions. No decisions are only awarded to the starting pitcher if the game is won or lost after the starting pitcher has left the game.

The Padres' first Opening Day starting pitcher was Dick Selma, who received a win against the Houston Astros. Randy Jones, Eric Show and Jake Peavy tie the Padres' record for most Opening Day starts with four. Peavy has the most consecutive Opening Day starts with four (2006–2009). Jones and Andy Benes each have had three consecutive Opening Day starts.

Overall, the Padres' Opening Day starting pitchers have a record of eight wins and five losses at, what was now known, Qualcomm Stadium, and two wins and one loss at Petco Park. In addition, although the Padres were nominally the home team on Opening Day 1999, the game was played in Estadio de Béisbol Monterrey in Monterrey, Mexico. The Padres' Opening Day starting pitchers' combined home record is eleven wins and six losses, and their away record is four wins and eight losses. The Padres went on to play in the MLB post-season five times, winning the National League Championship Series (NLCS) in 1984 and 1998. In those five seasons, the Opening Day starting pitchers had a combined record of three wins and 0 losses.

Key

Pitchers

References 

 
San Diego Padres Opening Day starting pitchers
Opening Day starting pitchers